William Cole Esty (March 6, 1895 – January 1954) was an American advertising executive and founder of William Esty Co.

After working at J. Walter Thompson starting in 1925, he started his own agency in 1932, with R.J. Reynolds Tobacco Company as his first client. His wife was performer and patron Alice Swanson Esty.

In 1982, William Esty & Co. was bought by Ted Bates Worldwide, which in turn was acquired by Saatchi & Saatchi in 1986. Two years later, Saatchi & Saatchi merged Esty with Campbell Mithun to become Campbell-Mithun-Esty. They have since dropped the Esty name.

References

External links
Cambell Mithun
Alice Esty papers via Bates College

1895 births
1954 deaths

20th-century American businesspeople